Pauline Jarman (born 15 December 1945) is a Welsh politician. She was the Plaid Cymru National Assembly for Wales Member for South Wales Central from 1999 to 2003 as well as being leader of Rhondda Cynon Taff Council from 1999 - 2004.

Educated at Mountain Ash Grammar School, she is a former Cynon Valley Borough Councillor and Mid Glamorgan County Councillor. Rhondda Cynon Taff Council Opposition Leader until 2022.  Jarman is a former Mayor. 

Jarman lost her seat on the council in May 2022, as a result of changes to ward boundaries which meant her former ward of Mountain Ash East has been merged. She had been a councillor for 46 years. After the result was announced for the new Mountain Ash ward, Jarman pledged to "wallow in the luxury of my family now" and also finish a book she had been writing.

References

Profile on BBC website September 1999

Offices held

1945 births
20th-century British women politicians
Living people
Members of Rhondda Cynon Taf County Borough Council
Members of Mid Glamorgan County Council
Plaid Cymru members of the Senedd
Wales AMs 1999–2003
Plaid Cymru politicians
Female members of the Senedd
Women councillors in Wales